Johann Wilhelm Hill (28 March 1838 – 6 June 1902) was a German pianist and composer.

Life and work
Wilhelm Hill was born in Fulda. He began studying piano and violin with his father at 6 years old. He devoted himself tirelessly to composing at age 14. From May 1854 Hill lived in Frankfurt am Main, where he was pupil of Heinrich Henkel and Johann Christian Hauff. He gave his first public piano performance in Fulda the following year, and performed in Frankfurt in January 1858.

In the 1880s, Hill taught at Lindner Institute and Julius Stockhausen's Vocal School. His opera Alona was awarded second prize in the competition for the opening of the new Frankfurt Opera House in 1882. He married Maria (Mary) Möhring in 1887 and soon after contracted an eye disease which affected his ability to teach and compose.

He composed two operas, a piano concerto, chamber music, piano compositions, choral and vocal works including numerous songs. Hill gained popularity through the song "Das Herz am Rhein" ("The Heart of the Rhine"; published in 1866), which was sung frequently by his friend, baritone Karl Hill.  The song soon appeared in various vocal and instrumental arrangements and became standard repertoire for vocalists and musicians of the time.

Hill died in Homburg, Saarland. He and his wife are buried in Frankfurt Hauptfriedhof.

Selected works

Opera
 Alona, Romantic Opera in 3 acts (1882); libretto by Otto Prechtler
 Jolanthe; based on King René's Daughter by Henrik Hertz

Concertante
 Concerto in C minor for piano and orchestra

Chamber music
 Piano Trio No. 1 in D major, Op. 12 (1863)
 Notturno, Scherzo und Romanze for viola and piano, Op. 18 (1868)
 Sonata in E minor for violin and piano, Op. 20 (1878)
 2 Romanzen for viola or cello and piano, Op. 22 (1869)
 2 Sonatinas for violin and piano, Op. 28 (1871)
     in B minor
 Piano Trio No. 2 in G major, Op. 43 (1878)
 Piano Quartet in E major, Op. 44 (1879)
 String Quartet in D major, Op. 45 (published 1915)

Piano
 Grande valse brilliante in E major, Op. 4 (1864)
 2 Klavierstücke, Op. 7 (1864)
     Impromptu
     Saltarello
 Große Polonaise in C minor, Op. 9 (1863)
 Valse-Caprice (1868)
 Romanze und Scherzo, Op. 15 (1870)
 6 Etüden, Op. 16 (1869)
 3 Sonatinen (progreßiv), Op. 27 (1871)
     in G Major
     in F Major
     in C Major
 Jugenderinnerungen (Youth Memories) for piano 4-hands, Op. 31 (1872)
     Zum Eingang
     Guter Laune
     Frisch durch
     Beim Feste
     Walzer
     Der Spielmann
 6 Characterstücke, Op. 32 (1872)
     Romanze
     Pastorale
     Menuett
     Jagdstück
     Impromptu
     Trauermarsch
 4 Albumblätter, Op. 33 (1872)
 Impromptu-Valse, Op. 34 (1872)
 Polonaise, Op. 35 (1874)
 Rondo capriccioso, Op. 36 (1874)
 Gavotte in F minor, Op. 47 (1888)
 Idyllen: Tonbilder aus dem Taunus, Op. 48 (1890)
     Morgenwanderung
     Unter Rosen
     Die Mühle
     In der alten Burg
     Am Brunhildisfelsen
     Kleines Intermezzo
     Zigeuner am Wege
     Bei Sonnenuntergang
 Tarantella for piano 4-hands, Op. 50 (1892)
 Capriccio in B major, Op. 52 (1896)
 2 Intermezzi, Op. 53 (1896)
     Alla Mazur in D major
     Intermezzo in B major
 Introduction und Allegro appassionato, Op. 54 (1896)
 Präludium und Fuge, Op. 55 (1899)
 Gavotte mignonne, Op. 59

Choral
 Hurrah, Germania! for 4-part male chorus a cappella (1870)
 6 Gesänge for 4-part male chorus a cappella, Op. 56 (1899)
     Die Grafen von Zollem: „Im Schwabenlande erhebt sich ein Schloß“
     Die Frauen vom Rhein: „Die Frauen in Deutschland sind minnig fürwahr“
     Abendsang: „Nun hängt das Schwert bei Seite“
     Maigruß: „Im Morgenrot die Berge glüh'n“
     Mosellied: „Weiß ein Fräulein eigner Art“
     „Als ich dich sah zum ersten Mal“
 Horch, die Vesperhymne klingt: „Horch, wie über's Wasser hallend“ for male chorus a cappella, Op. 60 (1900)

Vocal
 Vergißmeinnicht for voice and piano (1959)
 6 Lieder for voice and piano, Op. 3 (1860)
     Werden wir wieder zusammenstehn
     Fern und nah
     Du bist wie eine Blume; words by Heinrich Heine
     O Hoffnung, süße Himmelsmelodie
     Klinge, süßer Liebesschall
     Die Sonn' ist längst zur Ruh' gegangen
 3 Lieder for voice and piano, Op. 10 (1865)
     Walburgis
     In des Waldes Einsamkeit
     Du Blümlein welk
 2 Balladen for alto (or baritone) and piano, Op. 11 (1866)
     Mondwanderung; words by Robert Reinick
     Des Knaben Tod; words by Ludwig Uhland
 Das Herz am Rhein (The Maid of the Rhine) for voice and piano (1866); words by Heinrich Dippel
 Das Mädchen von Kola: „Mädchen von Kola, du schläfst“ for voice and piano, Op. 13 (1867)
 2 Lieder for soprano (or tenor) and piano, Op. 14 (1867); words by Emanuel Geibel
     „Die stille Wasserrose“
     Nach Norden: „Vöglein, wohin so schnell?“
 4 Gesänge for alto (or baritone) and piano, Op. 17 (1870)
     Curiose Geschichte
     Die Nacht ist klar
     Der Eichwald
     Nachtlied
 6 Lieder im Volkston for 2 voices and piano, Op. 19 (1869)
     Am Bache
     Guten Abend lieber Mondenschein
     Im tiefen Wald verborgen
     Der Lenz ist angekommen
     Es war ein alter König; words by Heinrich Heine
     Grüße
 Des Sängers Abschied for voice and piano, Op. 21 (1869)
 Thränen, Song Cycle for alto (or baritone) and piano, Op. 23 (1870); words by Adelbert von Chamisso
     Was ist's, o Vater!
     Ich habe, bevor der Morgen
     Nicht der Thau und nicht der Regen
     Denke, denke, mein Geliebter
     Ich hab' ihn im Schalfe zu sehen gemeint
     Wie so bleich ich geworden bin
 6 Gesänge for voice and piano, Op. 26 (1870)
     Abend im Walde
     Neig', schöne Knospe; words by Friedrich von Bodenstedt after Mirza Shafi Vazeh
     Suleika; words by Friedrich von Bodenstedt after Mirza Shafi Vazeh
     Mein Herz schmückt sich mit dir; words by Friedrich von Bodenstedt after Mirza Shafi Vazeh
     Liebesklange
     Gefunden; words by Johann Wolfgang von Goethe
 „O lieb, so lang du lieben kannst“ for baritone (or alto) and piano (1871); words by Ferdinand Freiligrath
 Schwäbisches Liebesliedchen: „Sag', gold'ger Schatz“ for voice and piano (1871)
 Der Äsra: „Täglich ging die schöne Sultanstochter“ for voice and piano, Op. 29 (1872); words by Heinrich Heine
 6 Gesänge for medium voice and piano, Op. 37 (1874)
     Stille Sicherheit: „Horch wie still es wird“; words by Nikolaus Lenau
     „Flohen die Wolken im Abendwind“
     Im Frühling: „Wenn der Apfelbaum blüht“; words by Friedrich von Bodenstedt
     „Unter den Zweigen“; words by Paul Heyse
     Klage eines Mädchens: „O Blätter, dürre Blätter“; words by Ludwig Pfau
     „Es war im Dorfe Hochzeit“; words by Friedrich von Bodenstedt
 4 Duetten for 2 female voices and piano, Op. 38 (1874)
     Nächtlich: „Der Mond umfluthet und umflicht“; words by Ernst, Baron von Feuchtersleben
     Da Drüben: „Da drüben überm Walde“; words by Julius Mosen
     Herbstlied: „Der Himmel ist grau umzogen“; words by Friedrich von Bodenstedt
     Juchhe!: „Wie ist doch die Erde so schön“; words by Robert Reinick
 2 ländliche Lieder for voice and piano, Op. 39 (1878); words by Emanuel Geibel
     Frühling: „Und wenn die Primel schneeweiß blickt“
     Winter: „Nun weht auf der Haide“
 5 Lieder for voice and piano, Op. 40 (1878)
     „Mir träumte einst ein schöner Traum“; words by Friedrich von Bodenstedt
     Schlaflied: „Schlaf ein, mein Kind“
     „Ich singe dich, liebliches Mädchen, du“
     Ein Tanz im Gebirge: „Juchhe! so schallt's den Berg hinauf“
     „Alles aufersteht uns wieder“
 6 Lieder for voice and piano, Op. 41 (1878)
     „Dem Bache entlang“
     „Oft sinn' ich hin und wieder“
     „Mein Herz thu' dich auf“
     Ständchen: „Komm in die stille Nacht“
     Neuer Frühling: „Neuer Frühling ist gekommen“
     „Treibt der Sommer seinen Rosen“; words by Karl Wilhelm Osterwald
 2 Mosellieder for voice and piano, Op. 58 (1899)
     Moselweinlied: „Vom Rhein hin bis zum heil'gen Trier“
     Moselweintrinklied: „Ich hab' getrunken manchen Wein“
 4 Lieder for voice and piano, Op. 61 (1900)
     „Es ist ein Schnee gefallen“
     „Zum grünen Hain im Abendschein“
     Der Leuchtkäfer: „Bei Tage, als im Sonnenlicht“
     „So fern ist des Liebsten ruhmvolles Grab“
 Mein Moselland: „Du meine Wiege, o Moselland“ for voice and piano, Op. 62 (1899)
 Herzenstausch: „Du sagst, mein liebes Mütterlein“ for voice and piano (1900)
 6 Gedichte for voice and piano, Op. 65 (1900)
     Liebe: „Was ist das nur in meiner Brust“
     „Verschließ, was dich bewegt“
     Gefunden: „Wie lange ich gesucht dich hab'“
     So geht's: „Du gabst mir einmal eine Rose“
     Was ich liebe?: „Ein stets blauer Himmel wäre nicht schön“
     Still!: „Still, still! Wein' nicht so heiß“

Bibliography
 Karl Schmidt: Wilhelm Hill, Leben und Werke, Leipzig, Breitkopf & Härtel, 1910.

References

External links
 
 Wilhelm Hill Estate 
 Bildarchiv Foto Marburg: Photo of Wilhelm Hill gravestone in Frankfurt Hauptfriedhof
  performed by Heinrich Schlusnus, baritone

1838 births
1902 deaths
German composers
German classical pianists
Male classical pianists
People from Fulda
Burials at Frankfurt Main Cemetery
19th-century classical pianists
19th-century German musicians
19th-century male musicians